Jordanes, also written as Jordanis or Jornandes, was a 6th-century Eastern Roman bureaucrat widely believed to be of Gothic descent who became a historian later in life. Late in life he wrote two works, one on Roman history (Romana) and the other on the Goths (Getica). The latter, along with Isidore of Seville's Historia Gothorum, is one of only two extant ancient works dealing with the early history of the Goths.

Other writers, such as Procopius, wrote works on the later history of the Goths. Getica has been the object of much critical review. Jordanes wrote in Late Latin rather than the classical Ciceronian Latin. According to his own introduction, he had only three days to review what Cassiodorus had written and so he must also have relied on his own knowledge.

Life
Jordanes writes about himself almost in passing:

Paria was Jordanes's paternal grandfather. Jordanes writes that he was secretary to Candac, an otherwise unknown leader of the Alans.

Jordanes was asked by a friend to write Getica as a summary of a multi-volume history of the Goths by the statesman Cassiodorus that existed then but has since been lost. Jordanes was selected for his known interest in history and because of his own Gothic background. He had been a high-level , or secretary, of a small client state on the Roman frontier in Scythia Minor, modern southeastern Romania and northeastern Bulgaria.

The nature and the details of the conversion remain obscure. The Goths had been converted with the assistance of Ulfilas (a Goth), made bishop on that account. However, the Goths had adopted Arianism. Jordanes's conversion may have been a conversion to the trinitarian Nicene Creed, which may be expressed in anti-Arianism in certain passages in Getica. In the letter to Vigilius he mentions that he was awakened  – "by your questioning".

Some manuscripts say that he was a bishop, and some even say bishop of Ravenna, but the name Jordanes is not known in the lists of bishops of Ravenna.

Works

Jordanes wrote Romana, about the history of Rome, but his best-known work is his Getica, which was written in Constantinople about 551 AD.
Jordanes wrote his Romana at the behest of a certain Vigilius. Although some scholars have identified this person with Pope Vigilius, there is nothing else to support the identification besides the name. The form of address that Jordanes uses and his admonition that Vigilius "turn to God" would seem to rule out this identification.

In the preface to his Getica, Jordanes writes that he is interrupting his work on the Romana at the behest of a brother Castalius, who apparently knew that Jordanes possessed the twelve volumes of the History of the Goths by Cassiodorus. Castalius wanted a short book about the subject, and Jordanes obliged with an excerpt based on memory, possibly supplemented with other material to which he had access. The Getica sets off with a geography/ethnography of the North, especially of Scandza (16–24).

He lets the history of the Goths commence with the emigration of Berig with three ships from Scandza to Gothiscandza (25, 94), in a distant past. In the pen of Jordanes, Herodotus's Getian demigod Zalmoxis becomes a king of the Goths (39). Jordanes tells how the Goths sacked "Troy and Ilium" just after they had recovered somewhat from the war with Agamemnon (108). They are also said to have encountered the Egyptian pharaoh Vesosis (47). The less fictional part of Jordanes's work begins when the Goths encounter Roman military forces in the third century AD. The work concludes with the defeat of the Goths by the Byzantine general Belisarius. Jordanes concludes the work by stating that he writes to honour those who were victorious over the Goths after a history spanning 2,030 years.

Controversy
Several Romanian and American historians wrote about Jordanes's error who considered that Getae were Goths. According to that interpretation, many of the historical data about Dacians and Getae were wrongly attributed to Goths.

Arne Søby Christensen and Michael Kulikowski argue in their works that Jordanes developed in Getica the history of Getic and Dacian peoples, which he supplemented with probably-invented events such as a Gothic war against Egypt. Caracalla in 214 received the titles "Geticus Maximus" and "Quasi Gothicus" after battles with Getae and Goths.

See also
 History of the Roman Empire

Notes

Citations

Sources

External links
 
 
 Jordanes, The Origins and Deeds of the Goths, translated by Charles C. Mierow. alternative.
 The Origins and Deeds of the Goths
 

6th-century Byzantine people of Gothic descent
6th-century Byzantine historians
6th-century Latin writers
Gothic writing
Latin historians